Andrés Flores was one of four important criollo composers in baroque Bolivia trained by Juan de Araujo, during his tenure as choirmaster of the Cathedral of Sucre (then called La Plata) 1680-1712. The other three notable criollo composers were Sebastián de los Ríos, Roque Jacinto de Chavarría, and Blas Tardío y Guzmán.

Works
 juguete Peregrina Agraciada Dios
 A este edificio célebre
 motet Tota pulchra es, Maria and villancico Ay del alma mía!
 Villancico

References

Bolivian composers
Bolivian male musicians
Male composers
Year of birth missing
Year of death missing